Alangium javanicum is a species of plant in the Cornaceae family. It is found in Brunei, Indonesia, Malaysia, Singapore, and the Philippines.

References

javanicum
Least concern plants
Taxonomy articles created by Polbot